The Bavarian Cup, was created in 1998 and functions as a qualifying competition to the German Cup. It is one of the 21 regional cups in Germany. It is one of three regional associations who are permitted to send two amateur teams to the DFB Cup, the three associations doing so being the largest.

An earlier incarnation of the Bavarian Cup existed from 1947 to 1954.

History
The seven Bezirke in Bavaria each played their own cup competition which in turn used to function as a qualifying to the German Cup (DFB-Pokal). Since 1998 these seven cup-winners plus the losing finalist of the region that won the previous event advanced to the newly introduced Bavarian Cup, the Toto-Pokal. The two finalists of this competition then advanced to the German Cup. Bavarian clubs which play in the first or second Bundesliga were not permitted to take part in the event, their reserve teams however could. Since 2008, reserve teams can not qualify for the DFB Cup any more, a right the clubs traded of for the privilege for reserve teams to play in the 3rd Liga.

Until 1998, the Bavarian Cup only existed in as much as it was a qualifying competition to the German Cup. This meant, in the later years two semi-finals were played to determine the two Bavarian amateur teams entering the DFB-Pokal, but, oddly, no final between these two teams was ever played.

Until 2008, no club had won the Bayernliga and the Bavarian Cup in the same season, until SpVgg Weiden did so in 2008–09.

2009 reform
The Bavarian Cup was completely overhauled and enlarged from 2009 onwards. Instead of only eight teams, it now consists of 64 clubs, and will exclude reserve teams. The first round will be held in September of each season and the teams will be made up from the following groups:
 All Bavarian teams in the 3rd Liga and Regionalliga.
 The 24 regional cup winners (Kreispokal), which will be held in August and September.
 The clubs in the Bayernliga and the three Landesligas play a qualification round to determine the teams to fill the remaining spots.
The reason behind the reform is to have all cup games in Bavaria on uniform dates and to allow the clubs in the Landesligas and above to enter the competition later, while clubs below that level will receive a better chance to win their local Kreispokal competition, and with this the associated prize money.

The competition, made up of the 64 teams, is played in a knock-out format. Two teams will continue to qualify for the German Cup, these being the cup winner and the winner of the game between the second and the third placed team. The later changed after 2012 when the second spot was awarded to the best-placed non-reserve side of the Regionalliga Bayern.

Regional cups

The Bavarian Cup, until 2009, was sub-divided into seven local cup competitions, running roughly along the boundaries of the seven Bezirke. The division was as follows:

 Oberbayern Cup: covering the region of Upper Bavaria
 Niederbayern Cup: covering the region of Lower Bavaria
 Schwaben Cup: covering the region of the Bavarian part of Swabia
 Oberpfalz Cup: covering the region of Upper Palatinate
 Mittelfranken Cup: covering the region of Middle Franconia
 Oberfranken Cup: covering the region of Upper Franconia
 Unterfranken Cup: covering the region of Lower Franconia

1947 to 1954 competition
From 1947 to 1954, a Bavarian Cup competition was held, which was disbanded shortly after the establishment of the DFB Cup. The first two editions were still organised by the Bavarian state sports association, the Bayerischer Landes-Sportverband, thereafter the competition was held by the Bavarian football association Bayerischer Fußball-Verband, which was founded in June 1946. It was only open to amateur sides, meaning clubs below the 2nd Oberliga Süd, except in 1951, when it was open to all Bavarian clubs. The finals were played by the following clubs:

Regional winners
The regional cup winners since 1975 were:

Pre-Bavarian Cup
Franconian regions and Upper Palatinate:

Old Bavaria and Swabia:

Bavarian Cup era

Notes

 The following teams qualified as regional-cup runners ups for the DFB Cup: Wacker Burghausen in 2009, SpVgg Ansbach in 2008, Jahn Regensburg in 2005 and TSV Aindling in 2004.

Finals of the Bavarian Cup
The finals of the Bavarian Cup:

 The reason for the heavy defeat of TSV Gerbrunn in 2003 is the fact that the Bavarian Cup final is always played at the beginning of the next season, in July, and the club had since withdrawn its team from the Bayernliga to a lower league, therefore fielding a considerable weaker team.

DFB Cup performance
Up until 2011, no team qualified from the Bavarian Cup to the national cup competition had won a game in this competition, with the FC Ingolstadt 04 (2005), Wacker Burghausen (2009) and Jahn Regensburg (2010) the only clubs to achieve a draw after extra time, all three going out on penalties. In the first round of the 2011–12 competition, SpVgg Unterhaching finally ended this drought for the Bavarian clubs, defeating SC Freiburg 3–2 courtesy of a converted 87th-minute penalty. The most common team to be drawn against for Bavarian clubs is Borussia Dortmund, having been the opposition on four occasions:

 1998–99 DFB-Pokal

 1999–2000 DFB-Pokal

 2000–01 DFB-Pokal

 2001–02 DFB-Pokal

 2002–03 DFB-Pokal

 2003–04 DFB-Pokal

 2004–05 DFB-Pokal

 2005–06 DFB-Pokal

 2006–07 DFB-Pokal

 2007–08 DFB-Pokal

 2008–09 DFB-Pokal

 2009–10 DFB-Pokal

 2010–11 DFB-Pokal

 2011–12 DFB-Pokal

 2012–13 DFB-Pokal

 2013–14 DFB-Pokal

 2014–15 DFB-Pokal

 2015–16 DFB-Pokal

 2016–17 DFB-Pokal

 2017–18 DFB-Pokal

 2018–19 DFB-Pokal

References

Sources
50 Jahre Bayrischer Fussball-Verband  50-year-anniversary book of the Bavarian FA, publisher: Vindelica Verlag, published: 1996
Das Fussball Jahresjournal  Annual end-of-season magazine of the Swabian FA

External links
 Bayrischer Fussball Verband (Bavarian FA)
 Bavarian League tables and results
 Website with tables and results from the Bavarian Oberliga to Bezirksliga

 
1998 establishments in Germany
1
Recurring sporting events established in 1998